Monocalcium citrate also known as calcium monocitrate is a compound with formula C6H8CaO7.  It is a calcium acid salt of citric acid.  It is used as a firming agent in food, and as an acidity regulator and sequestrant.

See also
 Calcium citrate
 Dicalcium citrate

References
Food Additives in Europe 2000, pp. 322-324, Nordic Council of Ministers, 2002 .

Citrates
Calcium compounds
Acid salts